Paraplatyptilia baueri is a moth of the family Pterophoridae. It is found in North America, including California.

References

Moths described in 1950
Moths of North America
baueri